The Morgan State Bears are the twelve varsity sports teams representing Morgan State University in Baltimore, Maryland in intercollegiate athletics, including men and women's basketball, cross country, tennis and track and field; women's-only bowling, softball, and volleyball; and men's-only football. The Bears compete in the NCAA Division I FCS and are members of the Mid-Eastern Athletic Conference.

Teams 

In October 2021, the school announced their plans to resurrect a wrestling team that last competed in 1997, set to begin in 2023.

Rivals

Morgan State and Howard University are historic rivals.  The two teams have met 73 times in football.  Morgan State leads the series 43–29–1.

References

External links